Glossary of terms commonly found in Stoic philosophy.

A
adiaphora ἀδιάφορα: indifferent things, neither good nor bad.
agathos ἀγαθός: good, proper object of desire.
anthrôpos ἄνθρωπος: human being, used by Epictetus to express an ethical ideal.
apatheia ἀπάθεια: serenity, peace of mind, such as that achieved by the Stoic sage.
aphormê ἀφορμή: aversion, impulse not to act (as a result of ekklisis). Opposite of hormê.
apoproêgmena ἀποπροηγμένα: dispreferred things. Morally indifferent but naturally undesirable things, such as illness.  Opposite of proêgmena.
aretê ἀρετή: Virtue. Goodness and human excellence.
askêsis ἄσκησις: disciplined training designed to achieve virtue.
ataraxia ἀταραξία: tranquillity, untroubled by external things.
autarkeia αὐτάρκεια: self-sufficiency, mental independence of all things.

D
daimôn δαίμων: divine spirit within humans.
diairesis διαίρεσις: analysis, division into parts. Used when distinguishing what is subject to our power of choice from what is not.
dikaiosyne δικαιοσύνε: justice, "consonant with the law and instrumental to a sense of duty" (Diogenes Laertius 7.98). One of the four virtues (justice, courage, temperance, wisdom/prudence).
dogma δόγμα: principle established by reason and experience.
doxa δόξα: belief, opinion.

E
ekklisis ἔκκλισις: aversion, inclination away from a thing. Opposite of orexis.
ekpyrôsis ἐκπύρωσις: cyclical conflagration of the Universe.
eph' hêmin ἐφ' ἡμῖν: up to us, what is in our power, e.g. the correct use of impressions.
epistêmê ἐπιστήμη: certain and true knowledge, over and above that of katalêpsis.
eudaimonia εὐδαιμονία: happiness, well-being.
eupatheia εὐπάθεια: good feeling (as contrasted with pathos), occurring in the Stoic sage who performs correct (virtuous) judgements and actions.

H
hêgemonikon ἡγεμονικόν: ruling faculty of the mind.
heimarmenê εἱμαρμένη: fate, destiny.
hormê ὁρμή: positive impulse or appetite towards an object (as a result of orexis). Opposite of aphormê.
hylê ὕλη: matter, material.

K
kalos κάλος: beautiful. Sometimes used in a moral sense: honourable, virtuous.
katalêpsis κατάληψις: clear comprehension and conviction.
kathêkon καθῆκον: duty, appropriate action on the path to Virtue.
kosmos κόσμος: order, world, universe.

L
logikos λογικός: rational.
logos λόγος: reason, explanation, word, argument.  Also, the ordering principle in the kosmos.
logos spermatikos λόγος σπερματικός: the generative principle of the Universe which creates and takes back all things.

N
nomos νόμος: law, custom.

O
oiêsis οἴησις: opinion, usually arrogant or self-conceited.
oikeiôsis οἰκείωσις: self-ownership and extension.  The process of self-awareness in all animals, which in humans leads to a sense of community.
orexis ὄρεξις: desire, inclination towards a thing, Opposite of ekklisis.
ousia οὐσία: substance, being.

P
paideia παιδεία: training, education.
palingenesia παλιγγενεσία: periodic renewal of the world associated with ekpyrôsis.
pathos πάθος: passion or emotion, often excessive and based on false judgements.
phantasiai φαντασία: impression, appearance, the way in which something is perceived.
phronesis φρόνησῐς: prudence, practical virtue and practical wisdom, or, colloquially, sense (as in "good sense", "horse sense").
physis φύσις: nature.
pneuma πνεῦμα: air, breath, spirit, often as a principle in Stoic physics.
proêgmenaπροηγμένα: preferred things. Morally indifferent but naturally desirable things, such as health.  Opposite of apoproêgmena.
proficiens Latin for prokoptôn
pro(h)airesis προαίρεσις: free will, reasoned choice, giving or withholding assent to impressions.
prokopê προκοπή: progress, on the path towards wisdom.
prokoptôn προκόπτων: Stoic disciple. A person making progress. Even though one has not obtained the wisdom of a sage; when appropriate actions are increasingly chosen, fewer and fewer mistakes will be made, and one will be prokoptôn, making progress.
prolêpsis πρόληψις: preconception possessed by all rational beings.
prosochē προσοχή: attitude and practice of attention, mindfulness. State of continuous, vigilant, and unrelenting attentiveness to oneself (prohairesis)
psychê ψυχή: mind, soul, life, living principle.

S
sophos σοφός: wise person, virtuous sage, and the ethical ideal.
synkatathesis (sunkatathesis) συγκατάθεσις: assent, approval to impressions, enabling action to take place.
sympatheia συμπάθεια: sympathy, affinity of parts to the organic whole, mutual interdependence.

T
technê τέχνη: craft, art.  The practical application of knowledge, especially epistêmê.
telos τέλος: goal or objective of life.
theôrêma θεώρημα: general principle or perception.
theos θεός: god; associated with the order in the Universe.
tonos τόνος: tension, a principle in Stoic physics causing attraction and repulsion, and also the cause of virtue and vice in the soul.

References 
 Devettere, R., Glossary, in Introduction to Virtue Ethics: Insights of the Ancient Greeks, pp. 139–154. Georgetown University Press. (2002).
 Haines, C., Glossary of Greek terms, in Marcus Aurelius, pp. 411–416.  Loeb Classical Library. (1916).
 Inwood, B., Gerson L., Glossary, in Hellenistic Philosophy: Introductory Readings, pp. 399–409. Hackett Publishing. (1997).
 Long, A. A., Glossary, in A Stoic and Socratic Guide to Life, pp. 275–276. Oxford University Press. (2002)
 Schofield, M., Index and Glossary of Greek terms, in The Stoic Idea of the City, pp. 171–172. Cambridge University Press. (1991).

Stoic terms
Stoicism
Greek words and phrases
Wikipedia glossaries using description lists